Turkey competed at the 1988 Summer Olympics in Seoul, South Korea.

Medalists

Competitors
The following is the list of number of competitors in the Games.

Results by event

Archery
In its second Olympic archery competition, Turkey was represented by three men and three women.

Women's Individual Competition:
 Huriye Eksi – Preliminary Round (→ 41st place)
 Elif Eksi – Preliminary Round (→ 42nd place)
 Selda Unsal – Preliminary Round (→ 50th place)

Men's Individual Competition:
 Vedat Erbay – 1/8 final (→ 22nd place)
 Kerem Ersu – Preliminary Round (→ 34th place)
 Izzet Avci – Preliminary Round (→ 61st place)

Women's Team Competition:
 Eksi, Eksi, and Unsal – Preliminary Round (→ 14th place)

Men's Team Competition:
 Erbay, Ersu, and Avci – Preliminary Round (→ 14th place)

Athletics

Men
Track and road events

Swimming
Men's 50m Freestyle
 Murat Tahir
 Heat – 24.64 (→ did not advance, 42nd place)
 Hakan Eskioğlu
 Heat – 25.24 (→ did not advance, 50th place)

Men's 100m Freestyle
 Murat Tahir
 Heat – 53.27 (→ did not advance, 44th place)
 Hakan Eskioğlu
 Heat – 53.95 (→ did not advance, 52nd place)

Men's 200m Freestyle
 Hakan Eskioğlu
 Heat – 1:58.45 (→ did not advance, 52nd place)

Men's 200m Individual Medley
 Hakan Eskioğlu
 Heat – 2:14.32 (→ did not advance, 52nd place)

References

Nations at the 1988 Summer Olympics
1988
1988 in Turkish sport